Scattergood Rides High is a 1942 American comedy film directed by Christy Cabanne and written by Michael L. Simmons. It is the sequel to the 1941 film Scattergood Meets Broadway. The film stars Guy Kibbee, Jed Prouty, Dorothy Moore, Charles Lind and Kenneth Howell. The film was released on May 8, 1942, by RKO Pictures.

Plot

Cast 
Guy Kibbee as Scattergood Baines
Jed Prouty as Mr. Van Pelt
Dorothy Moore as Helen Van Pelt
Charles Lind as Dan Knox
Kenneth Howell as Phillip Dane
Regina Wallace as Mrs. Van Pelt
Frances Carson as Mrs. Dane
Arthur Aylesworth as Cromwell
Paul White as Hipp
Philip Hurlic as Toby
Walter Baldwin as Martin Knox
Lee Phelps as Trainer

References

External links 
 

1942 films
American black-and-white films
Films directed by Christy Cabanne
American comedy films
1942 comedy films
Films scored by Paul Sawtell
RKO Pictures films
1940s English-language films
1940s American films